Wayne State University School of Social Work is a professional school within Wayne State University in Detroit, Michigan. The school is ranked No. 34 nationally in the U.S. News & World Report Best Global University Ranking. Its online social work degree program has been ranked No. 2 nationally by the Social Work Degree Guide, trailing only the Boston University School of Social Work.

History

Early history
The school's history dates to an undergraduate courses in social work that was begun at Detroit City College in the 1920s. In 1931, the school's social work curriculum was formalized to include case work. In 1936, Wayne University established a School of Public Affairs and Social Work. The school's founding was approved the university's Board of Governors in 1935. The school's early curriculum included courses in assessments, governmental correspondence, municipal sanitation, personnel administration, abnormal psychology, government accounting, and municipal law.

Brink years
In 1950, the public affairs program was moved to a new Department of Public Administration within the College of Liberal Arts, and the current School of Social Work emerged as a stand-alone school focused on social work. In November 1950, Charles B. Brink was appointed as the first dean of the new school. Brink remained the dean from 1950 to 1963.

The school was initially housed at the Williams House, where Gov. G. Mennen Williams was born. The Williams House was demolished in 1956.

Dillick years
Sidney Dillick was appointed as the school's second dean in October 1963.  He served as dean from 1964 to 1981.

In 1971, the school's black students and faculty requested a separate program for black students. The faculty approved the request, triggering protests from a white faculty member who argued that the separate program "amounts to the use of public money for segregated facilities."

Wayne State University has maintained accreditation from the Accreditation Commission of Social Work Education since 1975.

Chestang years
In March 1981, the School celebrated the golden jubilee of social work education at Wayne State. That same year, Leon Chestang was appointed as the school's third dean. Chestang served as dean from 1981 to 1999.

In 1990, the School of Social Work purchased the Thompson Home for Old Ladies, a landmark building located at the corner of Cass and Hancock in Detroit. The Italio-Victorian building, completed in 1884, was renovated by the school and has housed the school for more than 20 years. The Thompson House was slated to be converted into student housing in 2016.

Vroom years
Phyllis Vroom served as the school's fourth dean from 2000 to 2011. After stepping down as dean, she remained at the school as dean emerita.

In Varlesi v. Wayne State University, a graduate student in School of Social Work was awarded $848,690 in damages for pregnancy discrimination. The student, who was pregnant at the time, was given a failing evaluation in April 2008 after refusing to comply with directions to wear looser clothing and stop rubbing her belly to avoid sexually stimulating male clients while participating in an internship with the Salvation Army. The verdict was affirmed by the U.S. Court of Appeals for the Sixth Circuit in 2016. The school claimed to have conducted an investigation of the student's claim, but the Court found that no such investigation was ever undertaken.

Recent history
Cheryl E. Waites was appointed as the school's dean in 2012.

In 2016, Curtis Brahm, the school's associate director of business affairs, was charged with wire fraud arising out of his use of more than $75,000 in prepaid Visa gift cards intended to be used by participants in the school's studies. In February 2017, Brahm was placed on probation. He was accused of using the cards over a two-year period to pay for his food, gas, utilities, health care, and satellite TV service.

In February 2018, Sheryl Kubiak was named the school's dean, effective June 30, 2018. She replaces interim dean Jerrold Brandell. Joanne Sobeck is the director of the school's Center for Social Work Research.

Programs offered
Bachelors of Social Work (BSW)

The BSW program at Wayne State University provides an introduction to social work and professional practice.

Masters of Social Work (MSW)

The MSW program allows for students to gain professional experience and education in the field of social work.

Doctoral program (Ph.D.)

The School of Social Work first awarded doctoral degrees in 1949; this program prepares students for careers in education, academic research, research on clinical practice and positions of leadership in the clinical social work community, and leadership in social welfare policy planning and administration.

Dual-title, joint-degree programs, certificates and continuing education

Dual-title, joint degree programs, certificates & various continuing education credits are offered through the Wayne State University School of Social Work.

References

Schools of social work in the United States
1936 establishments in Michigan
Wayne State University